Nobilis, a Latin word meaning noble, may refer to :
 Nobilis, a role-playing game

See also
 Nobile (disambiguation)
 Nobiles, a social rank in ancient Rome
 Nobili, an Italian surname